Chantal Berthelot is a French politician, former member of the French National Assembly representing department of French Guiana.

Biography

Early life

In 1993, Chantal Berthelot founded an agricultural union, the Regional Farmers Group of Guyana (GRAG). Permanent expert on the board of directors of the Office for the Development of Agricultural Economics of the Overseas Departments (1990-1997), she is president of the Center for Management and Rural Economy of Guyana from 1985 to 1998.

Political career

Elected regional councilor in 1998 and 2004 on the list of the Guianese Socialist Party, she is the first vice-president of the Regional Council of French Guiana. In 2010, she is head of the list in the regional elections French Guiana.

Member of the National Assembly

Chantal Berthelot was elected to the French National Assembly on 17 June 2007, representing the 2nd constituency of French Guiana with the support of the Guianese Socialist Party and the Socialist Party. She was re-elected in 2012.

On June 10, 2017, she was eliminated in the first round with 19.48% of the votes cast, ahead of Lénaïck Adam, the REM candidate and a candidate published the protest movement of March 2017, Davy Rimane. Following her elimination, she resumed full-time work as a farmer in Macouria.

See also
 2007 French legislative election
 2012 French legislative election
 French Guiana's 2nd constituency

References

1958 births
Living people
Guianese Socialist Party politicians
French people of French Guianan descent
French Guianan women in politics
21st-century French women politicians
Women members of the National Assembly (France)
Deputies of the 13th National Assembly of the French Fifth Republic
Deputies of the 14th National Assembly of the French Fifth Republic
Black French politicians
People from Mana, French Guiana
Members of Parliament for French Guiana